This page is about the Serbia national football team, who had some players (who had at least one cap) born outside Serbia. Some of this players also played for Serbia and Montenegro. To be in the list, players must have one cap for Serbia. Players with caps for Serbia and Montenegro but without caps for Serbia born outside Serbia are not included in the list. Players in bold are currently representing the Serbian team.

List of players

List by country

References 

Serbia
Born outside
Serbian diaspora
Association football player non-biographical articles
Serbia